The 1928 WAFL season was the 44th season of the West Australian Football League. The most notable event of the season occurred off the field on Monday, 11 June, when champion East Perth coach Phil Matson was killed in a truck crash at Nedlands after being thrown into a telegraph post. The Royals under the coaching of Paddy Hebbard did manage to reach a challenge final against minor premiers East Fremantle, but were beaten and suffered an abrupt fall to a clear last the following season.

Old Easts, who were given consecutive byes in the second half of July to permit a tour of Tasmania and Victoria, were fourth upon returning to Perth but claimed top place two weeks later and after four losses to the Royals, beat them in the challenge final for the first of their second series of four successive premierships.

Fledgling club Claremont-Cottesloe (at this stage frequently called "the combine") failed to move from the bottom in its third season but nonetheless improved greatly from one win to five, in the process discovering their first great players in George Moloney and Keith Hough. A prelude to the future for the Tigers and indeed the entire WAFL was the first Aboriginal player in the league, Maley Hayward from Tambellup, who played with his two brothers for South Fremantle as late as 1937.

Home-and-Away season

Round 1

Round 2

Round 3

Round 4

Round 5

Round 6

Round 7 (Foundation Day)

Round 8

Round 9

Round 10

Round 11

Round 12

Round 13

Round 14

Round 15

Round 16

Round 17

Round 18

Round 19

Round 20

Round 21

Ladder

Finals

First semi-final

Second semi-final

Final

Grand Final

References

External links
Official WAFL website
West Australian Football League (WAFL) Season 1928

West Australian Football League seasons
WAFL